The Ovambo language is a dialect cluster spoken by the Ovambo people in southern Angola and northern Namibia, of which the written standards are Kwanyama and Ndonga.

The native name for the language is Oshiwambo (also written Oshivambo), which is also used specifically for the Kwanyama and Ndonga dialects. It is the largest spoken local language in Namibia, particularly by the Ovambo people.

The language is closely related to that of the Herero and Himba, the Herero language (Otjiherero). An obvious sign of proximity is the prefix used for language and dialect names, Proto-Bantu *ki- (class 7, as in the name of the Swahili language, Kiswahili), which in Herero has evolved to Otji- and in Ovambo further to Oshi-.

History

After Namibia's independence in 1990, the area previously known as Ovamboland was divided into the Ohangwena, Omusati, Oshana and Oshikoto Regions. The population, estimated at between 700,000 and 750,000, fluctuates remarkably. This is because of the indiscriminate border drawn up by the Portuguese and German Empires during colonial rule, which cut through the Oukwanyama tribal area, placing some in Angola and others in Namibia. This results in regular cross-border movement.

There are approximately one million Oshiwambo speakers in Namibia and Angola. Though it is mainly spoken in the northern regions of Namibia, it is widely spoken across the rest of the country by populations of migrant workers from Ovamboland. These workers comprise a large part of the population in many towns, particularly in the south, where there are jobs in the mining industry. For example, in Lüderitz, an 18-hour drive from Ovamboland, at least 50% of the population speaks Oshiwambo.

Name
The names Ambo and Ovambo appear to have originally been exonyms. Despite extensive speculation, their origin remains unknown.

The country was called Ovamboland and Amboland by the German colonial authorities. In English, Ovamboland predominates, though Ambo country is sometimes used, and in English publications from Namibia, Owamboland, Wamboland, and Owambo are seen. The endemic forms are Owambo kingdoms are Ndonga, Kwanyama and Kwambi

The people are generally called the Ovambo or Ambo in English. The endemic forms are Aawambo (Ndonga) and Ovawambo (Kwanyama); the singular in both cases is Omuwambo. The language is generally called Ovambo, Ambo, or Oshiwambo in English; the endonym in both standards is Oshiwambo.

Ovambo tribes and dialects 
There are eight dialects, including the two written standards Kwanyama and Ndonga.

The following table contains the names, areas, dialect names and the locations of the Ovambo tribes according to T. E. Tirronen's Ndonga-English Dictionary. The table also contains information concerning which noun class of Proto-Bantu the words belong to.

Maho (2009) lists the following as distinct languages in the Ovambo cluster:
Kwanyama
Kafima
Evale
Mbandja
Mbalanhu
Ndongwena
Kwankwa
Dombondola
Esinga
Ndonga
Kwambi
Ngandjera
Kwaluudhi
Kolonkadhi-Eunda

References

External links
 PanAfrican L10n page on Oshiwambo